Oscar C. Apfel (January 17, 1878 – March 21, 1938) was an American film actor, director, screenwriter, and producer. He appeared in more than 160 films between 1913 and 1939, and also directed 94 films between 1911 and 1927.

Biography
Apfel was born in Cleveland, Ohio. After a number of years in commerce, he decided to adopt the stage as a profession. He secured his first professional engagement in 1900, in his hometown. He rose rapidly and soon held a position as director and producer, and was at the time noted as being the youngest stage director in America. He spent 11 years on the stage on Broadway, then joined the Edison Manufacturing Company. Apfel first directed for Thomas A. Edison, Inc. in 1911–12, where he made the innovative short film The Passer-By (1912). He also did some experimental work at Edison's laboratory in Orange, on the Edison Talking Pictures devices.

Lasky
When Apfel left the Edison company, he joined Reliance-Majestic Studios, remaining with them 18 months. In 1913, he became one of two main directors for the Jesse Laskyn Feature Play Company, the other being Cecil B. DeMille. All the first Lasky pictures were produced under his direction. Among these were the notable successes The Squaw Man (1914), Brewster's Millions, The Master Mind, The Only Son, The Ghost Breaker, The Man on the Box, The Circus Man, and Cameo Kirby.

Apfel's directorial collaboration with DeMille was a crucial element in the development of DeMille's filmmaking technique.

Fox
In late 1914, Apfel left the Lasky Company and directed for various companies into the 1920s. His first move was to the producing staff of the William Fox Corporation, where he directed a series of pictures in which William Farnum starred. Some of these were A Soldier's Oath, Fighting Blood, The End of the Trail, The Battle of Hearts, and A Man of Sorrow.

Paralta
For the Paralta Company, where Apfel went after leaving the Fox Corporation, he produced Peter Kyne's A Man's a Man and The Turn of a Card in which J. Warren Kerrigan starred.

Armenian relief
Auction of Souls (1919), a public-awareness picture for the Armenian Relief Committee, was Apfel's work. This production commanded wide attention and attracted great crowds at the special showings, which took place at the Plaza and other prominent hotels. The sympathetic interest evoked by its revelations helped in materially adding to the large sums that were subscribed to this cause.

A series of pictures for the World Film Corporation, starring Kitty Gordon, Montague Love, June Elvidge, Louise Huff, and Evelyn Greeley, was also among Apfel's successful productions.

Final years
After many years as a director, he gradually returned to acting. On March 21, 1938, Apfel died in Hollywood from a heart attack.

Selected filmography

Actor

 The Texan (1930) as Thacker 
 Abraham Lincoln (1930) as Secretary of War Stanton 
 The Spoilers (1930) as A. Struve 
 Liliom (1930) as Stefen Kadar (uncredited) 
 The Virtuous Sin (1930) as Maj. Ivanoff 
 Huckleberry Finn (1931) as The King
 Five Star Final (1931) as Bernard Hinchecliffe 
 Sidewalks of New York (1931) as Judge 
 The Yellow Ticket (1931) as British Embassy Butler (uncredited)
 The Woman from Monte Carlo (1932) as Dr. Rabeouf  
 Speak Easily (1932) as Lawyer's Representative (uncredited) 
 A Successful Calamity (1932) as President of the United States 
 Make Me a Star (1932) as Henshaw 
 High Pressure (1932) as Mr. Hackett
 Call Her Savage (1932) as Doctor Treating Crosby (uncredited) 
 Rasputin and the Empress (1932) as Undetermined Secondary Role (uncredited) 
 Employees' Entrance (1933) as Board of Directors Member #5 (uncredited) 
 Gabriel Over the White House (1933) as German Delegate to Debt Conference (uncredited) 
 The Story of Temple Drake (1933) as District Attorney (uncredited)
 Storm at Daybreak (1933) as Counselor Velasch (uncredited) 
 Tugboat Annie (1933) as Reynolds (uncredited) 
 One Man's Journey (1933) as John Radford 
 The Bowery (1933) as Ivan Rummel 
 The World Changes (1933) as Mr. Morley 
 The House of Rothschild (1934) as Prussian Officer 
 Whirlpool (1934) as Newspaper Editor 
 Manhattan Melodrama (1934) as Speaker of Assembly (uncredited) 
 The Old Fashioned Way (1934) as Mr. Livingston (uncredited) 
 Bordertown (1935) as Judge Rufus Barnswell (uncredited) 
 Romance in Manhattan (1935) as The Judge 
 Dante's Inferno (1935) as Mr. Williams (uncredited) 
 Man on the Flying Trapeze (1935) as President Malloy 
 O'Shaughnessy's Boy (1935) as Martha's Lawyer 
 Sutter's Gold (1936) as Bartender (uncredited)
 Hearts in Bondage  (1936) as Capt. Gilman 
 San Francisco  (1936) as Founders' Club Member (uncredited) 
 Crack-Up (1936) as Alfred Knuxton 
 The Toast of New York (1937) as Wallack (uncredited)  
 Fifty Roads to Town (1937) as Smorgen
 Conquest (1937) as Count Potocka (uncredited) 
 Angel of Mercy (1939, Short) as Red Cross Representative (uncredited)

Director
 The Bells (1913)
 The Squaw Man (1914) 
 The Master Mind (1914)
 The Man on the Box (1914)
 The Battle of Hearts (1916)
 The Hidden Children (1917)
 The Turn of a Card (1918)
 The Rough Neck (1919)
 Ravished Armenia (1919)
 Phil for Short (1919)
 Ten Nights in a bar Room (1921)
 Bulldog Drummond (1922)
 The Sporting Chance (1925)
 The Thoroughbred (1925)
 The Last Alarm (1926)
 Somebody's Mother (1926)

References

External links

1878 births
1938 deaths
American male film actors
American male silent film actors
American male screenwriters
Film directors from Ohio
Male actors from Cleveland
19th-century American male actors
American male stage actors
20th-century American male actors
Screenwriters from Ohio
Film producers from Ohio
20th-century American male writers
20th-century American screenwriters